The Type 10 or 12 cm/45 10th Year Type naval gun was a  Japanese 120 mm calibre dual purpose anti-aircraft and coastal defense gun used during the Second World War. It was derived from the 12 cm/45 3rd Year Type naval gun. The Type 10  number was designated for the year the gun was accepted, the 10th year of Emperor Taishō's reign, 1927 in the Gregorian calendar.  It served as the secondary armament on a number of Japanese aircraft carriers and cruisers and as the main armament on smaller ships, in single or twin mountings.

Description
The weapon was originally designed for ship use and was produced in large numbers during 1944. The gun was also adapted for land use as a dual-purpose gun. The barrel was of autofretted mono-block construction and was held in a sleeve cradle mounted on a pedestal mount which permits 360° of traverse. The gun uses a hydro-spring recoil mechanism attached to the sleeve cradle and there are three recoil cylinders located on top of the breech with the two outside cylinders housing the recoil springs, and the center cylinder housing the hydraulic recuperator. The elevating handwheel is on the right side of the mount, while the traversing handwheel is on the left. To compensate for muzzle preponderance, spring equilibrators are mounted below the gun barrel. The gun is said to be well balanced, and easy to elevate. A semi-automatic horizontal sliding-wedge breech is used and Fixed QF 120 x 708R ammunition was used.

Naval use

See also

Weapons of comparable role, performance and era
 QF 4.7 inch Mk VIII naval gun : British equivalent naval anti-aircraft gun

References

Bibliography
 War Department TM-E-30-480 Handbook on Japanese Military Forces September 1944

External links

 12 cm/45 10th Year Type on navweaps.com

 

Naval guns of Japan
1
Anti-aircraft guns of Japan
120 mm artillery
Naval anti-aircraft guns
Military equipment introduced in the 1920s